Dyamappa Kallappa Naikar, commonly known as D. K. Naikar (7 July 1927 - 31 July 1999) was an Indian politician. He was born in Kolivad Village in Hubli Taluk of Dharwad district, Karnataka. He was a member of Lok Sabha from Dharwad North constituency in Karnataka State, India.

He was elected to  7th, 8th, 9th and 10th Lok Sabha from Dharwad North.

References

1927 births
People from Dharwad district
India MPs 1980–1984
India MPs 1984–1989
India MPs 1989–1991
India MPs 1991–1996
Karnataka politicians
Lok Sabha members from Karnataka
1999 deaths
State cabinet ministers of Karnataka
Indian National Congress politicians from Karnataka